The 155 mm Gun Motor Carriage M40 was an American self-propelled artillery vehicle built on a widened and lengthened Medium Tank M4A3 chassis, but with a Continental engine and with HVSS (Horizontal Volute Spring Suspension), which was introduced at the end of the Second World War.

Description
Equipped with a 155 mm M2 gun, it was designed to replace the earlier M12 Gun Motor Carriage. Its prototype designation was the T38, but this was changed to the M40 in March 1945.

A single pilot vehicle was used in the European Theatre in 1945 by the 991st Field Artillery Battalion, along with a related 8 inch Howitzer Motor Carriage T89, (later re-designated the M43 Howitzer Motor Carriage) which was sometimes also equipped with a 155 mm barrel. A total of 311 out of a planned 600 were completed by the Pressed Steel Car Company before the end of the war, 24 of which were later converted into M43s. From there it was deployed during the Korean War.

After World War II, the M40 was used by the British Army, who designated it 155 mm SP, M40 and called it Cardinal in the tradition of using ecclesiastical names for SP artillery, such as Deacon, Priest, Bishop and Sexton.

Gun section
A complete gun section consisted of one M40 GMC and one M4A1 high speed tractor towing a 4-wheel, 8-ton M23 ammunition trailer. Each battery had four gun sections. The M4A1/M23 combination replaced the earlier M30 cargo carrier.

Variants

The Army planned to use the same T38 chassis for a family of SP artillery:
Cargo Carrier T30 - a few built before cancellation in December 1944 to make more chassis available for GMCs
8 inch Howitzer Motor Carriage M43 - 8 in (203 mm) HMC, standardized August 1945, 48 built
250 mm Mortar Motor Carriage T94 - 10 in (250 mm) MMC, began design Feb. 1945, one prototype completed in 1946

Related vehicles
105 mm Howitzer Motor Carriage M7B1 - self-propelled 105 mm Howitzer Motor Carriage (HMC) based on the M4A3 Sherman chassis.
155 mm Gun Motor Carriage M12 - self-propelled 155 mm Gun Motor Carriage (GMC).
Cargo Carrier M30 - an M12 with crew and ammunition space in lieu of the gun.

Surviving vehicles
 one at the American Military Museum, El Monte (USA)
 one at United States Army Ordnance Museum
 one at the Imperial War Museum, Duxford (UK)
 one at Royal Artillery Museum, Woolwich (UK)
 one at the Technik Museum, Sinsheim (Germany)
 Two M40 GMCs – Arkansas National Guard Mus, Camp Robinson, Little Rock, AR (USA)
 one at City vehicle storage area, Charleston, AR (USA)
 one at Fort Chaffee Maneuvering Training Center, AR (USA) 
 one at the United States Army Field Artillery Museum, Fort Sill, Ok (USA)

See also
 List of "M" series military vehicles
 M4 Sherman tank
 M41 Howitzer Motor Carriage
 G-numbers
Surviving M40 and M43

Notes

References

External links

World War II vehicles
AFV database
Training film
Tech Manual TM9-747

Self-propelled artillery of the United States
World War II self-propelled artillery
World War II armored fighting vehicles of the United States
Cold War armored fighting vehicles of the United States
M040
155 mm artillery
M4 Sherman tanks
Military vehicles introduced from 1940 to 1944